Vanesa Sršen (born ) is a retired Croatian female volleyball player.

She was part of the Croatia women's national volleyball team at the 1998 FIVB Volleyball Women's World Championship in Japan.

References

1971 births
Living people
Croatian women's volleyball players
Place of birth missing (living people)